The Fighting Marine is a 1926 American drama film serial directed by Spencer Gordon Bennet, and featured the only screen performance by the boxing heavyweight champion, Gene Tunney.

Cast

Preservation
The Fighting Marine is now considered to be a lost film.

Chapter titles

 The Successful Candidate
 The Second Attack
 In the Enemy's Trap
 The Desperate Foe
 Entombed
 The Falling Tower
 Waylaid
 Challenged
 The Signal Shot
Fired and Hired

See also
 List of film serials
 List of film serials by studio
 List of lost films

References

External links

1926 films
1926 drama films
Silent American drama films
American silent serial films
American black-and-white films
Pathé Exchange film serials
Films directed by Spencer Gordon Bennet
Lost American films
Films about the United States Marine Corps
1926 lost films
Lost drama films
1920s American films